The 2005 Sun Bowl was a college football bowl game played on December 30, 2005, in El Paso, Texas. Sponsored by the Vitalis brand of hair tonic made by Bristol-Myers, the game was officially known as the Vitalis Sun Bowl. It was the 72nd Sun Bowl. It featured the UCLA Bruins, and the Northwestern Wildcats. UCLA overcame a 22–0 deficit to Northwestern in the first quarter to win 50–38. UCLA running backs Chris Markey and Kahlil Bell shared the most valuable player award, the first such shared award in Sun Bowl history. Defensive tackle Kevin Mims of  Northwestern won the Jimmy Rogers, Jr. Most Valuable Lineman award. This was the biggest comeback in UCLA football history, until the 2017 UCLA vs. Texas A & M game, in which the Bruins scored 34 points. It still stands as of 2021 as the largest comeback in Sun Bowl History. It also is the highest scoring Sun Bowl game.

The game would unexpectedly be Randy Walker's last as Northwestern head coach. Walker died of an apparent heart attack the following June.

Game summary
The weather was clear and 56 degrees Fahrenheit.

Northwestern's Joel Howells started the scoring with a 33-yard field goal to give Northwestern an early 3–0 lead. Kevin Mims later scored on a 33-yard interception return to increase Northwestern's lead to 9–0. Mark Philmore rushed 19 yards for a touchdown to put Northwestern up 15–0. However, the kicker missed his second consecutive extra point attempt.

Nick Roach intercepted another UCLA pass and returned it 35 yards for a touchdown to give Northwestern a 22-0 first quarter lead. At the end of the quarter, running back Kahlil Bell put UCLA on the board, by rushing for a 5-yard touchdown run to cut the lead to 22–7. Less than 2 minutes later, quarterback Drew Olson connected with wide receiver Ryan Moya for a 58-yard touchdown pass, to cut the lead to 22–14.

Kahlil Bell scored his second rushing touchdown of the game by rushing 6 yards for a touchdown. Drew Olson then found tight end Marcedes Lewis for the two-point conversion to tie the game at 22. With 29 seconds left in the first half, Olson found wide receiver Marcus Everett for an 8-yard touchdown pass to give UCLA a 29-22 halftime lead.

In the third quarter, Olson connected with Michael Pitre for a 5-yard touchdown pass, to extend the lead to 36–22. Amado Villarreal connected on a 31-yard field goal for Northwestern, to cut the lead to 36–25.

The last 2:30 of the game featured a lot of scoring. Quarterback Brett Basanez found Mark Philmore for an 8-yard touchdown pass to cut the lead to 36–31 with 2:29 remaining. The ensuing onside kick was recovered by Brandon Breazell and returned 42 yards for a touchdown, extending UCLA's lead to 43–31. With 24 seconds in the game, Basanez found wide receiver Shaun Herbert for a 5-yard touchdown pass, pulling NU to 43–38. The ensuing onside kick was recovered by Breazell, and once again returned 45 yards for a touchdown. That made the final margin 50–38.

Scoring

First quarter
Northwestern - Joel Howells, 33-yard field goal. 
Northwestern - Kevin Mims, 30-yard interception return. Howells’ kick blocked. 
Northwestern - Mark Philmore, 19-yard run. Howells’ kick failed. 
Northwestern - Nick Roach, 35-yard interception return. Howells converts.
UCLA - Kahlil Bell, five-yard run. Jimmy Rotstein converts.

Second quarter
UCLA - Ryan Moya, 58-yard pass from Drew Olson. Rotstein converts. 
UCLA - Bell, six-yard run. Lewis, pass from Olson. 
UCLA - Marcus Everett eight-yard pass from D. Olson. Rotstein converts.

Third quarter
UCLA - Michael Pitre, five-yard pass from D.Olson. Rotstein converts.
Northwestern - Amado Villarreal, 31-yard field goal.

Fourth quarter
Northwestern - Mark Philmore, eight-yard pass from Brett Basanez. Basanez conversion pass intercepted. 
UCLA - Brandon Breazell, 42-yard kickoff return. Brian Malette converts. 
Northwestern - Shaun Herbert, five-yard pass from Basanez. Villarreal converts.
UCLA - Breazell, 45-yard kickoff return. Rotstein converts.

Aftermath
The 2005 Sun Bowl game, sponsored by Vitalis, had a $1.5 million payout.

UCLA Bruin team comeback records
This was the third record setting comeback for the 2005 UCLA Bruin football team. Until the 2017 season, they ranked first, second, and third in all-time scoring comebacks to win for the UCLA Bruins.
 Down 22 points in the first quarter vs. Northwestern (2005 Sun Bowl) 0-22 / Final Score: 50-38
 Down 21 points in the fourth quarter  at Stanford (2005) 3-24 / Final Score: 30-27ot
 Down 21 points in the second quarter at Washington State (2005) 7-28 / Final Score: 44-41ot

Sun Bowl records
The Northwestern Wildcats broke five records. 
Most Passing Completions: 38 
Most First Downs, Team: 33 
Most Penalties, Team: 5 
First Quarter Points, Team: 22
Total offensive yardage: 584 total yards.

The UCLA Bruins broke three records.
Kickoff Returns for Touchdowns: 2
Most Points Game, Team: 50 
Biggest Comeback: down 22 Northwestern (22) vs. UCLA (0)

Together Northwestern and UCLA broke or tied six records.
Most Penalties, Combined 7 Northwestern (5) and UCLA (2) (tied with Purdue and Washington in the 2001 Sun Bowl)
Most First Downs, Combined 57 Northwestern (33) and UCLA (24)
Most First Quarter Points, Combined: 29 Northwestern (22) and UCLA (7)
First Half Points, Combined: 51 UCLA (29) and Northwestern (22)
Most Points Game, Combined: 88 UCLA (50) and Northwestern (38)
Total offensive yardage: 1,037 yards.

In addition, Brett Basanez tied the individual record of 38 completions and broke the offensive yardage record at 448 yards.

Sun Bowl Legends
CBS Announcer Verne Lundquist who had been the Sun Bowl broadcaster starting in 1988, and former UCLA Bruins coach Terry Donahue were named Legends of the Sun Bowl.

References

External links
http://www.sunbowl.org/

Sun Bowl
Sun Bowl
Northwestern Wildcats football bowl games
UCLA Bruins football bowl games
December 2005 sports events in the United States
2005 in sports in Texas